The 2010 Melbourne Cup, the 150th running of Australia's most prestigious Thoroughbred horse race, was held on Tuesday, 2 November 2010 at 3:00 PM.  local time (0400 UTC).

It was won by Americain, a French-trained horse who had won the Geelong Cup at his only other Australian start. Second placing went to the lightly raced Lexus Stakes winner Maluckyday, while third placing went to dual Cox Plate winner and short-priced favourite So You Think.

The official winning time was 3:26.87 with the margins of 2.8 lengths and 0.5 lengths back to third. The race was run on a slow (6) track with persistent rain falling causing flooding and closure of the Cup Day car park.

Field
Horses are bred and trained in Australia, unless otherwise indicated. All columns in this table can be sorted by clicking the icons in the top row.

References

External links 
2010 Melbourne Cup result

2010
Melbourne Cup
Melbourne Cup
2010s in Melbourne
November 2010 sports events in Australia